The 2016–17 Munster Rugby season was Munster's sixteenth season competing in the Pro12, alongside which they also competed in the European Rugby Champions Cup. It was Anthony Foley's third season as head coach and Rassie Erasmus's first season as director of rugby.

Events
In August 2016, Munster started using the new central training base at the University of Limerick campus, thus marking an end to the days of splitting training between Cork and Limerick.		

Munster opened their pre-season with a 17–0 victory over Zebre in a pre-season friendly at Waterford Regional Sports Centre on 19 August.	
	
The new Pro12 season was launched on 23 August at the Aviva Stadium. Munster began the new season on 3 September with an away game against Scarlets.

On 26 August, Munster defeated Worcester in their final pre-season friendly at Musgrave Park, scoring seven-tries during the game.

On 16 October 2016, head coach Anthony Foley died suddenly while in Paris with Munster.
The team was preparing to face Racing 92 in their opening game of the 2016–17 European Rugby Champions Cup. The match was postponed as a result of Foley's death.

On 22 October Munster paid tribute to the late Anthony Foley with a 38-17 bonus-point win over Glasgow in the European Champions Cup.
A minutes silence was observed before the match during which a special tribute took place in the West Stand with the words "AXEL" spelled out with the number 8 on either side. The Munster Rugby Supporter's Club Choir performed 'There Is An Isle', and soprano Sinead O'Brien joined the Choir to perform 'Stand Up And Fight.

On 10 December, Munster defeated Leicester 38–0 at Thomond Park in their second European Rugby Champions Cup game of the season to go top of the pool with ten points after two games.

Over the Christmas period, Munster defeated Leinster at Thomond Park on 26 December 29-17 to move five points clear of them at the top of the Pro12.
They followed up that victory with a 16–9 victory over Connacht on 31 December at the Galway Sportsgrounds.

On 7 January, Munster played the re-arranged game against Racing 92 in Paris and had a bonus point victory by 32–7.

On 14 January, Francis Saili scored the winning try in Munster's 12–14 away win against Glasgow Warriors, a win that secured Munster's place in the quarter-finals of the 2016–17 European Rugby Champions Cup. It was the 11th win out of the last 12 matches for Munster.

In March, it was announced that Donnacha Ryan would leave Munster at the end of the season to join Racing 92.

On 1 April, Munster reached their first European Champions Cup semi-final in three years with a 41–16 victory over Toulouse.

On 22 April, Munster played Saracens in the European Champions Cup semi-final at the Aviva Stadium. They lost the game 26-10 to go out of the competition.
Munster minus the injured Conor Murray scored the first penalty of the game but Saracens took control of the game and scored two tries to win comfortably in the end. It was also confirmed that coach Rassie Erasmus would remain in charge for the next season after much speculation that he would return to South-Africa.

On 4 May, Tyler Bleyendaal was named as the Munster Player of the Year at an awards ceremony in Cork. The ceremony was attended by 250 guests with 11 awards presented on the day.

On 20 May, Munster defeated the Ospreys by 23–3 in the Pro12 playoff semi-final to advance to the 2017 Pro12 Grand Final against Scarlets at the Aviva Stadium on 27 May.
The match was Donnacha Ryan's and Francis Saili's final appearance for Munster at Thomond Park.

On 27 May, Munster lost the 2017 Pro12 Grand Final to Scarlets 46–22.

Coaching and management staff 2016–17

Senior Playing Squad 2016–17

Players In
 Sammy Arnold from  Ulster
 John Andress from  Edinburgh
 Darren O'Shea from  Worcester Warriors
 Jean Kleyn from  Stormers
 Jaco Taute from  Stormers / 
 Collie O'Shea from  Leinster
 Steve Crosbie from  Wanganui
 Rhys Marshall from  Chiefs
 Thomas du Toit from  Sharks

Players Out
 Jordan Coghlan to  Nottingham
 Gearoid Lyons to  Nottingham
 Shane Buckley to  Nottingham
 Jack Cullen to  London Scottish
 Cathal Sheridan to  UL Bohemians
 BJ Botha to  Lyon
 Johnny Holland retired
 Denis Hurley released
 Gerhard van den Heever to  Yamaha Jubilo

 Internationally capped players in bold.
 Players qualified to play for Ireland on residency or dual nationality. *
 Irish provinces are currently limited to four non-Irish eligible (NIE) players and one non-Irish qualified player (NIQ or "Project Player").

2016–17 Pro12

Play-offs

Semi-finals

Final

2016–17 European Rugby Champions Cup

Munster faced Racing 92, Glasgow Warriors and Leicester Tigers in Pool 1 of the 2016-17 Champions Cup. They were seeded in the bottom tier following their sixth-placed position in the 2015–16 Pro12.

Quarter-final

Semi-final

References

External links
2016–17 Munster Rugby season at official site
2016–17 Munster Rugby season at Pro12

2016-17
2016–17 Pro12 by team
2016–17 in Irish rugby union
2016–17 European Rugby Champions Cup by team